Forgotten Tomb is an Italian metal band from Piacenza. It was founded in 1999 by Ferdinando "Herr Morbid" Marchisio as a one-man black metal project after the disbanding of his previous black metal band Sacrater. The lyrical themes of the band's early albums revolve mostly around depression and suicide, while the recent albums' lyrics deal with negativity and nihilism.

To date the group has released nine full-length albums.

History 
The band was founded in 1999 by Ferdinando "Herr Morbid" Marchisio as a one man project after the disbanding of his previous black metal band Sacrater. The lyrical themes of the band's early albums revolve mostly around depression and suicide, while the recent albums' lyrics deal with negativity and nihilism.

Forgotten Tomb's first EP Obscura Arcana Mortis (2000), was recorded by Herr Morbid as a solo undertaking in 1999. It was released the following year in CD format through Treblinka Productions and limited to 215 copies. The band's first full-length album, Songs to Leave, was released in 2002 through Selbstmord Services and was also recorded and produced solely by Herr Morbid. The following album, Springtime Depression (2003) was the final Forgotten Tomb album to only include Herr Morbid on all instruments, it was proceeded with the album Love's Burial Ground in 2004 which was the first Forgotten Tomb album to feature a complete lineup in its recording. Both Springtime Depression and Love's Burial Ground were released through Adipocere Records. In 2006, Forgotten Tomb signed with Avantgarde Music and recorded its fourth full-length, Negative Megalomania. The album was released in January 2007. In 2006, they also appeared on the Katatonia tribute album A tribute to Katatonia, December songs, covering the song "Nowhere".

A compilation album, Vol. 5: 1999–2009, featuring re-recordings of classic songs and two full covers of Nirvana and Black Flag was released on August 16, 2010 via Avantgarde Music.

Discography
Albums
Songs to Leave (2002)
Springtime Depression (2003)
Love's Burial Ground (2004)
Negative Megalomania (2007)
Under Saturn Retrograde (2011)
...And Don't Deliver Us from Evil... (2012)
Hurt Yourself and the Ones You Love (2015)
We Owe You Nothing (2017)
Nihilistic Estrangement (2020)

EPs
Obscura Arcana Mortis (2000)
Deprived (2012)

Other releases
 Tormenting Legends Part I (2003)
 December Songs - A Tribute To Katatonia (Katatonia cover album, 2006)
Vol 5: 1999–2009 (live in studio compilation album, 2010)
A Tribute to GG Allin – Split by Forgotten Tomb / Whiskey Ritual (2011)
 Darkness in Stereo: Eine Symphonie des Todes - Live in Germany (2014)

Members

 Current Members
 Ferdinando "Herr Morbid" Marchisio – bass (1999–2003), drum programming (1999–2002), guitars, vocals (1999–present)
 Alessandro "Algol" Comerio – bass guitar (2003–present)
 Gianmarco "Asher" Rossi – drums (2003–present)

 Past Members
 Torment (Real Name Unknown) – bass guitar (1999)
 Tiziano "Razor SK" Scassa – lead guitars (2003–2011)
 Henrik "Nordvargr" Björkk – effects (2004–2008; session 2004)
 Andrea "A." Ponzoni – lead guitars (2011–2017)

 Session Musicians
 Ted Wedebrand – drums (2002–2003)

Timeline

References

External links
Official Facebook
Forgotten Tomb on Avantgarde Music
Forgotten Tomb on Metal Storm

Italian black metal musical groups
Italian doom metal musical groups
Italian gothic metal musical groups
Musical groups established in 1999
1999 establishments in Italy